Dugald McColl (May 16, 1846 – August 10, 1915) was a political figure in Ontario. He represented Elgin West in the Legislative Assembly of Ontario from 1890 to 1894 as a Conservative member.

He was born in Southwold, Ontario, the son of Nicol McColl and Janette Campbell. McColl inherited the family homestead. He served as deputy reeve and then reeve for Southwold township. In 1875, McColl married Mary Black. He was vice-president of the township insurance company. He died at St. Thomas in 1915.

References

External links

1846 births
1915 deaths
Progressive Conservative Party of Ontario MPPs